She Couldn't Say No is the name of several films. The 1930 and 1940 films were based on the play She Didn't Say No! by Benjamin Kaye.

She Couldn't Say No (1930 film), starring Winnie Lightner and Chester Morris
She Couldn't Say No (1939 film), starring Tommy Trinder, Fred Emney and Googie Withers
She Couldn't Say No (1940 film), featuring Roger Pryor and Eve Arden
She Couldn't Say No (1954 film), with Robert Mitchum and Jean Simmons